"I Ain't Gonna Stand for It" is the second single from Stevie Wonder's 1980 album, Hotter Than July. It reached number four on the Billboard R&B singles chart and number 11 on the Hot 100. It also hit number 10 on the UK Singles Chart. The song is famous for Wonder's imitation of a seasoned country-and-western crooner and his inspiring drumming. Charlie and Ronnie Wilson of The Gap Band provide backing vocals on the song. It was covered by Eric Clapton in 2001.

Record World called it a "beautifully constructed song" and praised the "warm, universal lyrics" as well as the "irresistible chorus hook."

Personnel
Stevie Wonder – lead vocals, piano, clavinet, cabasa, drums, background vocals
Nathan Watts – bass
Ben Bridges – acoustic guitar, electric guitar
Isaiah Sanders – Fender Rhodes
Hank Devito – steel guitar
Charlie Wilson – background vocals
Ronnie Wilson – background vocals

Chart history

Weekly charts

Year-end charts

Eric Clapton's version

On April 3, 2001, the British rock musician Eric Clapton released the track with 4 minutes and 50 seconds duration along with the two B-sides "Losing Hand" and "Johnny Guitar" as a cover version on a compact disc single and maxi single release under Reprise Records. The recording was produced by Clapton himself along with his long-time collaborator Simon Climie. The title was also released as part of his 2001 studio album Reptile, just a month before Clapton's interpretation of the song was released compact disc single format. Besides being released as a single and on the Reptile studio album, the song was released to several compilation albums and B-side single releases. AllMusic critic William Ruhlmann notes that by "remaking [the] song by Wonder means competing with [him] vocally, and as a singer Clapton isn't up to the challenge. He is assisted by the current five-man version of the Impressions, who do much to shore up his vocal weaknesses, but he still isn't a disciplined or thoughtful singer. Of course, when that distinctive electric guitar sound kicks in, all is forgiven".

Although the song was well received in digital media, it did not make a big splash on the international music charts, reaching only position 63 in Switzerland and peaking at number six on the Polish LP3 single chart.

Music video
A music video to accompany the single release was shot on February 14, 2001 during the Reptile World Tour rehearsal. The official music video starts with a rehearsal photo session and later features Eric Clapton and his band – namely Andy Fairweather Low, Steve Gadd, Nathan East, Paulinho da Costa, David Sancious and The Impressions – performing the song, while early biographical pictures of Clapton can be seen. During other passages of the video, early childhood memories of the band members are shown. While performing the song in the rehearsal situation, sounds of Clapton and his band talking, laughing and playing table football can be seen and heard. The video to "I Ain't Gonna Stand for It" fades out to another rehearsal section, as the music does also, to the end. It was published under license of the Warner Music Group originally in 2001 for TV broadcasting and was made available legally via various Internet platforms in 2007.

Weekly charts

References

1980 singles
2001 singles
1980 songs
Eric Clapton songs
Stevie Wonder songs
Motown singles
Songs written by Stevie Wonder
Reprise Records singles
Song recordings produced by Stevie Wonder